is a 2012 Japanese drama film directed by Osamu Minorikawa and based on the manga series Su-chan by Miri Masuda. It premiered at the 25th Tokyo International Film Festival on October 24, 2012 and was released in Japan on March 2, 2013.

Cast
Kō Shibasaki as Yoshiko Morimoto 
Yōko Maki as Maiko Okamura
Shinobu Terajima as Sawako Hayashi 
Shōta Sometani as Kosuke Chiba 
Arata Iura as Seichiro Nakata 
Hana Kino as Yoko Koba
Poon-chaw Guin as Nobuko Hayashi
Akiko Kazami as Shizue Hayashi 
Megumi Sato as Mika Iwai
Mio Uema as Chika Takeda
Aoi Yoshikura as  Minami Koba
Ai Takabe as Chigusa Maeda

Reception

Critical response
On Film Business Asia, Derek Elley gave the film a 6 out of 10, calling it "a mature chick-flick with a fine array of actresses but rather over-slack pacing."

Accolades

References

External links
 

2012 drama films
2012 films
Live-action films based on manga
Japanese drama films
2010s Japanese films